Luís Manuel Alfar Horta (born 15 January 1952) is a former Portuguese football player.

He played 8 seasons and 195 games in the Primeira Liga for Belenenses, Atlético CP and Braga.

Club career
He made his Primeira Liga debut for Atlético CP on 8 September 1974 in a game against Leixões.

References

External links
 

1952 births
Footballers from Lisbon
Living people
Portuguese footballers
Liga Portugal 2 players
Atlético Clube de Portugal players
Primeira Liga players
C.F. Os Belenenses players
S.C. Braga players
Associação Académica de Coimbra – O.A.F. players
F.C. Barreirense players
Association football defenders
S.U. Sintrense players
Portugal B international footballers